Lolium mazzettianum is a species of grass in the family Poaceae. It is native in south-central of China. It is perennial and mainly grows on temperate biomes. Lolium mazzettianum was first published in 1993 by John M. Darby.

References

Pooideae
Flora of China
Plants described in 1993